Swades: We, the People is a 2004 Indian Hindi-language drama film co-written, directed and produced by Ashutosh Gowariker. The film stars Shah Rukh Khan, Gayatri Joshi and Kishori Ballal while Daya Shankar Pandey, Rajesh Vivek, Lekh Tandon appear in supporting roles.

The plot was based on two episodes of the series Vaapsi on Zee TV's Yule Love Stories (1994–95) which had Gowariker playing the role of Mohan Bhargav. The story of the lead role setting up a micro hydroelectric project to generate electricity was reported to be inspired by the 2003 Kannada film Chigurida Kanasu which was based on the novel of the same name by Jnanapith awardee K. Shivaram Karanth and Bapu Kuti by Rajni Bakshi. The music and background score was composed by A. R. Rahman, with lyrics penned by Javed Akhtar. 

Swades was theatrically released on 17 December 2004, and it opened to rave reviews from critics, with praise for the performances of Khan, Joshi and Ballal, and the story, screenplay, and soundtrack. However, it emerged as a commercial failure at the box office.

At the 50th Filmfare Awards, Swades received 8 nominations, including Best Film, Best Director (Gowarikar) and Best Music Director (Rahman), and won Best Actor (Khan) and Best Background Score (Rahman).

It was dubbed in Tamil as Desam and released on 26 January 2005, coinciding with Indian Republic Day. Despite its commercial failure, Swades is regarded ahead of its time and is now considered a cult classic of Hindi cinema and one of the best films in Shah Rukh Khan's filmography. Shahrukh's performance in this film is regarded as among the best performances of his career. The film is owned by Red Chillies Entertainment.

Plot
Mohan Bhargava is a non-resident Indian who works as a Project Manager on the Global Precipitation Measurement (GPM) program at NASA in the United States. Mohan came to U. S. for college studies and kept on living there after his parents in India died in a car accident. He keeps worrying about Kaveri Amma, a nanny at his home in Uttar Pradesh who looked after him during his childhood days. After his parents' death, Kaveri Amma went to live in an old age home in Delhi and eventually lost contact with Mohan. Mohan wishes to go to India and bring Kaveri Amma back with him to the U. S. Due to the recent success of Phase I of his project, he takes a few weeks off and travels to India. He goes to the old age home but learns that Kaveri Amma no longer lives there and went to a village named Charanpur a year ago. Mohan then decides to travel to Charanpur, in Uttar Pradesh.

Mohan decides to rent a recreational vehicle to reach the village fearing that he might not get the required facilities there. Upon reaching Charanpur, he meets Kaveri Amma and learns how his childhood friend Geeta (whom he called "Gitli" in his childhood) brought Kaveri Amma to stay with her after Mohan's parents died. Geeta runs a school in Charanpur and works hard to improve the living conditions of the villagers through education. However, the village is divided largely by caste and religious beliefs. Geeta does not like Mohan's arrival as she thinks that he will take Kaveri Amma back with him to the U. S., leaving her and her younger brother Nandan "Chiku" alone. Kaveri Amma tells Mohan that she needs to get Geeta married first and that it is her responsibility. Geeta believes in women empowerment and gender equality. This attracts Mohan towards Geeta and he too tries to help her by campaigning for education among backward communities and also girls. Mohan befriends villagers Nivaaran and Melaram, and they support him in his campaign. Mohan also wins the attention of Dadaji, a kind village chief.

Slowly love blossoms between Mohan and Geeta. Kaveri Amma asks Mohan to visit a nearby village named Kodi, and collect money from a man named Haridas who owes it to Geeta. Mohan visits Kodi and feels pity seeing Haridas' poor condition, which is such that he is unable to provide his family with meals every day. Haridas tells Mohan that since his caste profession of a weaver wasn't earning him any money, he shifted to tenant farming. But this change in profession led to his ostracization from the village and the villagers even denied him water for his crops. Mohan understands the pathetic situation and realises that many villages in India are still like Kodi. He returns to Charanpur with a heavy heart and decides to do something for the welfare of the village.

Mohan extends his leave by three more weeks. He learns that electricity inconsistency and frequent power cuts are a big problem in Charanpur. He decides to set up a small hydroelectric power generation facility from a nearby water source. Mohan purchases all the equipment needed from his own funds and oversees the building of the power generation unit. The unit works and the village gets sufficient, consistent power from it.

Dadaji's health deteriorates and he passes away. Mohan is repeatedly called by NASA officials as the GPM project he was working on is reaching important stages and he has to return to the U. S. soon. Kaveri Amma tells him that she prefers to stay in Charanpur as it will be difficult for her to adapt to a new country at her age. Geeta also tells him that she will not settle down in another country and she would prefer it if Mohan stay in India with her and Kaveri Amma. Mohan returns to the U. S. with a heavy heart to complete the project. However, in the U. S., he has flashbacks of his time in India and wishes to return. After the successful completion of his project, he leaves U. S. and returns to India with intentions of working at the Vikram Sarabhai Space Center, from where he can also work with NASA. The film ends by showing Mohan staying in the village and wrestling with his friend Nivaaran near a temple.

Cast
 Shah Rukh Khan as Mohan Bhargav
 Gayatri Joshi as Geeta "Gitli" (Chiku's elder sister and Mohan's childhood friend/love interest)
 Kishori Ballal as Kaveri Amma (Mohan's nanny)
 Rajesh Vivek as Nivaaran Dayal Srivastava (Postman at Charanpur)
 Lekh Tandon as Dadaji
 Daya Shankar Pandey as Mela Ram (A eatery owner at Charanpur)
 Smith Sheth as Nandan "Chiku" (Geeta's younger brother)
 Bachan Pachehra as Haridas
 Vishnu Dutt Gaur as Mr. Vishnu Dutt (Charanpur Panchayat Member)
 Farrukh Jaffar as Panch Fatima Bi
 Visshwa Badola as Panch Munishwar
 Bhim Vakani as Panch Narayan
 Dilip Ambekar as Panch Hariya
 Raja Awasthi as Panch Gungadin
 Rahul Vohra as Vinod Raaz
 Rajesh Balwani as Rahul Sinha
 Peter Rawley as John Stockton
 Mayuri Bagade as Book Store Girl 
 Makrand Deshpande as traveller who shows Mohan the way to Charanpur

Production

Inspiration
Swades is inspired by the story of Aravinda Pillalamarri and Ravi Kuchimanchi, the non-resident Indian couple who returned to India and developed a pedal power generator to light remote, off-the-grid village schools. Gowariker spent considerable time with Pillalamarri and Kuchimanchi, both dedicated Association for India's Development (AID) volunteers. He supposedly visited Bilgaon, an Adivasi village in the Narmada valley, which is the backdrop of the Narmada Bachao Andolan (NBA) movement. The people of Bilgaon are credited with doing 200 person-days of shramdaan (community service) to make their village energy self-sufficient. The Bilgaon project is recognised as a model for replication by the Government of Maharashtra.

The film was reported to be inspired by two episodes of the series titled Vaapsi on Zee TV's Yule Love Stories (1993–95). The story of the lead role setting up a micro hydro electric project to generate electricity was reported to be inspired by the Kannada novel Chigurida Kanasu by K. Shivaram Karanth and Bapu Kuti by Rajni Bakshi.

Themes
Mahatma Gandhi's great-grandson, Tushar Gandhi, noted the theme of Gandhism in the film. The name of the main character portrayed by Shah Rukh Khan is Mohan, which was Gandhi's birth name (Mohandas or "Mohan"). The film opens with the quotation:

Gowariker tries to address the lack of scientific temperament and widespread ignorance among the rural folks through the energetic number "Ye Tara Wo Tara", where Mohan is seen encouraging the children to experience the fascinating world of stars through his telescope. In a symbolic manner, the song rejects the defunct divisions of caste and class and at the same time, through its protagonist, tries to instill in the audience an appreciation of curiosity and observation.

Casting and filming

Gowariker initially offered Mohan's role to Aamir Khan (who worked in Gowariker's 2001 film Lagaan), but he rejected it because he found the story to be weak. Mohan's role was then offered to Hrithik Roshan, who refused after reading the script. Gowariker then offered Mohan's role to Shah Rukh, who finally accepted it after listening to the story and he started crying during the story's narration. Bhanu Athaiya, an Oscar winner for Gandhi (1982), was the costume designer for the film.

Swades was the first Indian film to be shot inside the NASA headquarters and inside the NASA research center at the Launch Pad 39A of the Kennedy Space Center in Florida. The rainfall monitoring satellite known as the Global Precipitation Measurement (GPM) in the film is an actual NASA mission and was launched in 2014.
A major part of the film was shot in Menawali, Maharashtra.

Reception

Critical reception
The film received critical acclaim and went on to become a cult classic, and Khan's performance as Mohan Bhargava is considered one of his best to date.

Subhash K. Jha of Indiatimes Movies gave the film 4.5 stars out of 5 and said, "Swades is a unique experiment with grassroots realism. It is so politically correct in its propagandist message that initially you wonder if the Government of India funded the director's dream."

Mayank Shekhar from Mid-Day gave it 4 stars, stating, "I cannot think of a better film for the longest that deserved a stronger recommendation for both touring cinemas of India's villages, and plush multiplexes of Mumbai or Manhattan."

Jitesh Pillai of the Sunday Times of India gave the film 4 stars and said "After Lagaan, what? The answer's blowing in the wind. Swades! Here's the verdict: This is a gutsy and outstanding film. Welcome back to real, solid film-making." He added, "Swades is undoubtedly the No. 1 movie of the year."

Shradha Sukumaran of Mid-Day gave it 3.5 stars and said, "At the end of it, Swades is a far braver film than Lagaan. It could have hit the high note – if it hadn't tried so hard."

Avijit Ghosh wrote in The Telegraph, "With its gentle humour, the film acts as an entertaining vehicle for social change. And hopefully, it will do more for positive nationalism than the Union government's Directorate of Audio Visual Publicity (DAVP) ads ever will."

Box office
Swades earned  net box office in India. In the overseas market, the film made $2,790,000. The film topped the Chennai box office on its opening weekend.

Soundtrack
The song "Dekho Naa" is a modified version of the song "Kichchu Tha" from the film, Baba (2002).

On 27 March 2021, members of United States Navy Band sang "Yeh Jo Des Hai Tera" for Taranjit Singh Sandhu, the Ambassador of India to the United States and United States Navy Chief of Naval Operations at a special dinner event. The video of the band members singing surfaced on Twitter and received praise and nostalgia from Shahrukh Khan, A. R. Rahman and netizens alike.

Tamil version
The Tamil soundtrack under the title Desam was composed by A.R. Rahman. All Lyrics were written by Vaali. According to the Indian trade website Box Office India, with around 13,00,000 units sold, this film's soundtrack album was the eleventh highest-selling of the year.

Awards
National Film Awards
 Best Male Playback Singer – Udit Narayan for "Yeh Taara Woh Taara"
 Best Cinematography – Mahesh Aney

Global Indian Film Awards
 Best Actor – Shahrukh Khan
 Best Newcomer – Gayatri Joshi

Zee Cine Awards
 Best Director (Critics) – Ashutosh Gowariker
Best Female Debut – Gayatri Joshi
 Best Story –  Ashutosh Gowariker
Best Sound Re-recording – Hitendra Ghosh

Star Screen Awards
 Most Promising Female Newcomer – Gayatri Joshi

Stardust Awards
 Dream Director – Ashutosh Gowariker

Bollywood Movie Awards
 Best Female Debut – Gayatri Joshi

Film Café Awards
 Best Actor – Shahrukh Khan

 50th Filmfare Awards:

Won

 Best Actor – Shah Rukh Khan
 Best Background Score – A. R. Rahman

Nominated

 Best Film – Ashutosh Gowariker
 Best Director – Ashutosh Gowariker
 Best Music Director – A. R. Rahman
 Best Lyricist – Javed Akhtar for "Yeh Taara Woh Taara"
 Best Male Playback Singer – Udit Narayan and Master Vignesh for "Yeh Taara Woh Taara"
 Best Female Playback Singer – Alka Yagnik for "Saawariya"

Legacy
The character Mohan Bhargav played by Khan is reprised again in the film Brahmāstra: Part One – Shiva. Director Ayan Mukerji confirmed that it is the same character from the previous film.

See also
 Swadeshi movement

Notes

External links
 
 
 
 Official site

Reviews
 BBC review – BBC
 Times of India review – Times of India

2004 films
Films directed by Ashutosh Gowariker
2000s Hindi-language films
2004 drama films
Indian films based on actual events
Hindi-language films based on actual events
Films about social issues in India
Films whose cinematographer won the Best Cinematography National Film Award
Films scored by A. R. Rahman
Indian drama films
UTV Motion Pictures films
Hindi-language drama films
Films set in Uttar Pradesh